The following lists events that happened in 1919 in El Salvador.

Incumbents
President: Alfonso Quiñónez Molina (until March 1), Jorge Meléndez (starting March 1)
Vice President: Vacant (until March 1), Alfonso Quiñónez Molina (starting March 1)

Events

January
 12–14 January – Voters in El Salvador elected National Democratic Party candidate Jorge Meléndez to be President of El Salvador with 185,492 votes and a margin of 100%. He ran unopposed.

March
 1 March – Jorge Meléndez was sworn in as President of El Salvador. Alfonso Quiñónez Molina was sworn in as Vice President.

Deaths
 16 June – Fernando Figueroa, politician (b. 1849)
 8 October – Carlos Meléndez Ramírez (b. 1861)

References

 
El Salvador
1910s in El Salvador
Years of the 20th century in El Salvador
El Salvador